Marquis Gong can refer to:

 Marquis Gōng of Cai ( 10th century BC?), fourth ruler of Cai
 Marquis Gòng of Cai (died 760 BC), ninth ruler of Cai
 Marquess Gong of Han (died 363 BC)
 Cao Hong (died 232), Cao Wei general
 Han Ji (died 238), Cao Wei politician